Baño Grande (Spanish for big bath) is a former swimming pool and historic site located in El Yunque National Forest in Río Grande, Puerto Rico. It is also known as La Mina Pool (Piscina de la Mina or just La Piscina), after La Mina River. It is the larger of the two swimming pools built by the Civilian Conservation Corps (CCC) in El Yunque, being three times larger than the nearby Baño de Oro pool.

The pool was designed by architects R.E. Pidgeon and H. Randolph (who also designed the Baño de Oro pool and related recreational infrastructure), and it was built by the Civilian Conservation Corps between 1935 and 1938 using stone masonry and reinforced concrete as the material. It was operational between the years 1935 and 1968 when it was closed due to safety issues. Although the pool was closed and swimming is no longer permitted, it remained well-maintained, and today it is preserved as a historic site open to the public as a scenic spot. The pool was listed on the National Register of Historic Places on February 28, 2017, as one of the New Deal Era Constructions in the Forest Reserves in Puerto Rico (1933–1942).

Baño Grande is located in the La Mina Recreational Area within the Palo Colorado section of El Yunque, and it is connected to the trail network of the forest.

Gallery

References

External links 
 Baño Grande 

Buildings and structures on the National Register of Historic Places in Puerto Rico
Tourist attractions in Puerto Rico
1938 establishments in Puerto Rico
Río Grande, Puerto Rico
Swimming venues
Civilian Conservation Corps in Puerto Rico
El Yunque National Forest
Park buildings and structures on the National Register of Historic Places
American Craftsman architecture in Puerto Rico